The men's 200 metres was an event at the 1980 Summer Olympics in Moscow. The competition was held on July 27, 1980, and on July 28, 1980. There were 57 competitors from 37 nations. The maximum number of athletes per nation had been set at 3 since the 1930 Olympic Congress. The event was won by Pietro Mennea of Italy, the nation's first victory in the event since 1960 and second overall (tied for second-most with Canada behind the United States' 12 wins). Great Britain earned its first medal in the men's 200 metres since 1928 with Allan Wells' silver. Don Quarrie of Jamaica, the defending champion, took bronze. Mennea (the 1972 bronze medalist) and Quarrie were the fifth and sixth men to earn multiple medals in the event.

Summary

Random lane draw put the two semifinal winners on the outside, Leonard having the misfortune to draw lane 1, Mennea in lane 8. Wells was just inside of Mennea in 7 while Quarrie drew lane 4. Wells just eked into the final with a fourth place in his semifinal. Had timed qualification been involved, he only had the tenth-fastest time in the semis.

Wells, who disliked using starting blocks but used them, was out fast, making up the stagger on Mennea 40 metres into the race. Coming off the turn Mennea was two metres back, behind both Leonard and Quarrie. Mennea accelerated down the straight edging closer to Wells with every step. He caught Wells five metres before the finish and continued past him for the win, regarded as one of the great comebacks in Olympic sprinting. Quarrie was able to outlean Leonard for the bronze.

Background

This was the 18th appearance of the event, which was not held at the first Olympics in 1896 but has been on the program ever since. Three of the eight finalists from the 1976 Games returned: gold medalist Don Quarrie of Jamaica, fourth-place finisher (and 1972 bronze medalist) Pietro Mennea of Italy, and seventh-place finisher Colin Bradford of Jamaica. The odds on favourite was Mennea, the current world record holder. Other favourites in the field included Quarrie, Silvio Leonard of Cuba, and Allan Wells of Great Britain.

Angola, Benin, Botswana, Guinea, Laos, Lebanon, Libya, Mozambique, the Seychelles, Sierra Leone, Syria, and Zambia each made their debut in the event. France and Great Britain each made their 16th appearance, most of the nations competing in 1980 but one fewer than the United States, missing the event for the first time.

Competition format

The competition used the four round format introduced in 1920: heats, quarterfinals, semifinals, and a final. The "fastest loser" system introduced in 1960 was used in the heats.

There were 9 heats of between 6 and 7 runners each (before withdrawals), with the top 3 men in each advancing to the quarterfinals along with the next 5 fastest overall. The quarterfinals consisted of 4 heats of 8 athletes each; the 4 fastest men in each heat advanced to the semifinals. There were 2 semifinals, each with 8 runners. Again, the top 4 athletes advanced. The final had 8 runners. The races were run on a 400 metre track.

Records

These were the standing world and Olympic records (in seconds) prior to the 1980 Summer Olympics.

No new world or Olympic records were set during the competition.

Schedule

All times are Moscow Time (UTC+3)

Results

Heats

Held on July 27, 1980.

Heat 1

Heat 2

Heat 3

Heat 4

Heat 5

Heat 6

Heat 7

Heat 8

Heat 9

Quarterfinals

Held on July 27, 1980.

Quarterfinal 1

Quarterfinal 2

Quarterfinal 3

Quarterfinal 4

Semifinals

Held on July 28, 1980.

Semifinal 1

Semifinal 2

Final

Held on July 28, 1980.

See also
 1976 Men's Olympic 200 metres (Montreal)
 1978 Men's European Championships 200 metres (Prague)
 1982 Men's European Championships 200 metres (Athens)
 1983 Men's World Championships 200 metres (Helsinki)
 1984 Men's Olympic 200 metres (Los Angeles)

References

 2
200 metres at the Olympics
Men's events at the 1980 Summer Olympics